"On the Pulse of Morning" is a poem by writer and poet Maya Angelou that she read at the first inauguration of President Bill Clinton on January 20, 1993. With her public recitation, Angelou became the second poet in history to read a poem at a presidential inauguration, and the first African American and woman. (Robert Frost was the first inaugural poet, at the 1961 inauguration of John F. Kennedy.) Angelou's audio recording of the poem won the 1994 Grammy Award in the "Best Spoken Word" category, resulting in more fame and recognition for her previous works, and broadening her appeal.

The poem's themes are change, inclusion, responsibility, and role of both the President and the citizenry in establishing economic security. Its symbols, references to contemporary issues, and personification of nature has inspired critics to compare "On the Pulse of Morning" with Frost's inaugural poem and with Clinton's inaugural address. It has been called Angelou's "autobiographical poem", and has received mixed reviews. The popular press praised Clinton's choice of Angelou as inaugural poet, and her "representiveness" of the American people and its president. Critic Mary Jane Lupton said that "Angelou's ultimate greatness will be attributed" to the poem, and that Angelou's "theatrical" performance of it, using skills she learned as an actor and speaker, marked a return to the African-American oral tradition of speakers such as Frederick Douglass, Martin Luther King Jr. and Malcolm X. Poetry critics, despite praising Angelou's recitation and performance, gave mostly negative reviews of the poem.

Background
When Angelou wrote and recited "On the Pulse of Morning", she was already well known as a writer and poet. She had written five of the seven of her series of autobiographies, including the first and most highly acclaimed, I Know Why the Caged Bird Sings (1969). Although she was best known for her autobiographies, she was primarily known as a poet rather than an autobiographer. Early in her writing career she began alternating the publication of an autobiography and a volume of poetry. Her first volume of poetry Just Give Me a Cool Drink of Water 'Fore I Diiie, published in 1971 shortly after Caged Bird, became a best-seller. As scholar Marcia Ann Gillespie writes, Angelou had "fallen in love with poetry" during her early childhood in Stamps, Arkansas. After her rape at the age of eight, which she depicted in Caged Bird, Angelou memorized and studied great works of literature, including poetry. According to Caged Bird, her friend Mrs. Flowers encouraged her to recite them, which helped bring her out of her self-imposed period of muteness caused by her trauma.

Angelou was the first poet to read an inaugural poem since Robert Frost read his poem "The Gift Outright" at President John F. Kennedy's inauguration in 1961, and the first Black woman. When it was announced that Angelou would read one of her poems at Clinton's inauguration, many in the popular press compared her role as inaugural poet with that of Frost's, especially what critic Zofia Burr called their "representativeness", or their ability to speak for and to the American people. The press also pointed to the nation's social progress that a Black woman would "stand in the place of a white man" at his inauguration, and praised Angelou's involvement as the Clinton administration's "gesture of inclusion".

Angelou told her friend Oprah Winfrey that the call requesting her to write and recite the poem came from television producer Harry Thomason, who organized the inauguration, shortly after Clinton's election. Even though she suspected that Clinton made the request because "he understood that I am the kind of person who really does bring people together", Angelou admitted feeling overwhelmed, and even requested that the audiences attending her speaking engagements pray for her.

She followed her same "writing ritual" that she had followed for years and used in writing all of her books and poetry: she rented a hotel room, closeted herself there from the early morning to the afternoon, and wrote on legal pads. After deciding upon the theme "America", she wrote down everything she could think of about the country, which she then "pushed and squeezed into a poetic form". Angelou recited the poem on January 20, 1993.

Themes
"On the Pulse of Morning" shared many of the themes in President Clinton's inaugural address, which he gave immediately before Angelou read her poem, including change, responsibility, and the President's and the citizenry's role in establishing economic security. The symbols in Angelou's poem (the tree, the river, and the morning, for example) paralleled many of the same symbols Clinton used in his speech, and helped to enhance and expand Clinton's images. Clinton's address and the poem, according to Hagen, both emphasized unity despite the diversity of American culture. "On the Pulse of Morning" attempted to convey many of the goals of Clinton's new administration.

Burr compared Angelou's poem with Frost's, something she claimed the poetry critics who gave "On the Pulse of Morning" negative reviews did not do.  Angelou "rewrote" Frost's poem, from the perspective of personified nature that appeared in both poems. Frost praised American colonization, but Angelou attacked it. The cost of the creation of America was abstract and ambiguous in Frost's poem, but the personified Tree in Angelou's poem signified the cultures in America that paid a significant cost to create it. Both Frost and Angelou called for a "break with the past", but Frost wanted to relive it and Angelou wanted to confront its mistakes. Burr also compared Angelou's poem with Audre Lorde's poem "For Each of You", which has similar themes of looking towards the future, as well as with Walt Whitman's "Song of Myself" and Langston Hughes' "The Negro Speaks of Rivers". According to Hagen, the poem contains a recurring theme in many of Angelou's other poems and autobiographies, that "we are more alike than unalike".

"On the Pulse of Morning" was full of contemporary references, including toxic waste and pollution. Angelou's poem was influenced by the African-American oral tradition of spirituals, by poets such as James Weldon Johnson and Langston Hughes, and by modern African poets and folk artists such as Kwesi Brew and Efua Sutherland, which also influenced her autobiographies.

Critical response, impact, and legacy
According to Lupton, "On the Pulse of Morning" is Angelou's most famous poem. Lupton has argued that "Angelou's ultimate greatness will be attributed" to the poem, and that Angelou's "theatrical" performance of it, using skills she learned as an actor and speaker, marked a return to the African-American oral tradition of speakers such as Frederick Douglass, Martin Luther King Jr. and Malcolm X. British reporter Kate Kellaway compared Angelou's appearance as she read the poem at Clinton's inauguration with the eight-year-old child in Caged Bird, noting that the coats she wore in both occasions were similar: "She looked magnificent, sternly theatrical with an unsmiling bow mouth. She wore a coat with brass buttons, a strange reminder of the eight-year-old Maya Angelou who stood in a courtroom, terrified at the sight of the man who had raped her". Gillespie stated regarding Kellaway's observations: "But standing tall on the steps of the Capitol, she was light-years removed from that terrible time, and America was no longer an 'unfriendly place.' Her poem 'On the Pulse of Morning' was a soaring call for peace, justice, and harmony. Capturing the hope embodied in the human spirit, it was a solemn and joyful reminder that all things are possible. She wished us 'Good morning' in her poem, and one felt as if a new day was truly dawning."

Angelou recognized that although "On the Pulse of Morning" was a better "public poem" than a great poem, her goal of conveying the message of unity was accomplished. Poet David Lehman agreed, stating that although it fulfilled its theatrical and political objectives, the poem was "not very memorable". Poet Sterling D. Plumpp found Angelou's performance "brilliant", but was "not as enthusiastic about it as a text". Burr stated that the negative reviews of Angelou's poem, like the majority of the reviews about her other poetry, was due to their elitism and narrow views of poetry, which were limited to written forms rather than spoken ones like "On the Pulse of Morning", which was written to recite aloud and perform. Burr compared the response of literary critics to Angelou's poem with critics of Frost's poem: "Frost's powerful reading served to supplement the poem in the sense of enhancing it, while Angelou's powerful reading of her poem supplemented it in the sense of making evident its inadequacy and lack."

Angelou's recitation of "On the Pulse of Morning" resulted in more fame and recognition for her previous works, and broadened her appeal "across racial, economic, and educational boundaries". The week after Angelou's recitation, sales of the paperback version of her books and poetry rose by 300–600 percent. Bantam Books had to reprint 400,000 copies of all her books to keep up with the demand. Random House, which published Angelou's hardcover books and published the poem later that year, reported that they sold more of her books in January 1993 than they did in all of 1992, accounting for a 1200 percent increase. The sixteen-page publication of the poem became a best-seller, and the recording of the poem was awarded a Grammy Award.

The poem was featured in the film August 28: A Day in the Life of a People, which debuted at the opening of the Smithsonian's National Museum of African American History and Culture in 2016.

See also

References
Footnotes

Citations

Works cited
 Burr, Zofia (2002). Of Women, Poetry, and Power: Strategies of Address in Dickinson, Miles, Brooks, Lorde, and Angelou. Urbana, Illinois: University of Illinois Press. 
 Gillespie, Marcia Ann, Rosa Johnson Butler, and Richard A. Long (2008). Maya Angelou: A Glorious Celebration. New York: Random House. 
 Hagen, Lyman B. (1997). Heart of a Woman, Mind of a Writer, and Soul of a Poet: A Critical Analysis of the Writings of Maya Angelou. Lanham, Maryland: University Press of America. 
 Lupton, Mary Jane (1998). Maya Angelou: A Critical Companion. Westport, Connecticut: Greenwood Press. 
  Pisko-Freund, Lois (1994-03-01). "Poetry and Motion: Comparing Angelou's Poetry and Clinton's Inaugural Theme of Change". Florida Communication Journal (Florida Communication Association) 22 (1): pp. 35–42

External links
Transcript of the poem, via archive.org's archive of the USEmbassy.gov page

1993 poems
Presidency of Bill Clinton
Grammy Award for Best Spoken Word Album
Inaugural poems
Poetry by Maya Angelou